= McConville Peak =

Mountain in Oregon, United States

Coordinates: 42°32′04″N 123°02′51″W

McConville Peak is a summit in the U.S. state of Oregon. The elevation is 3,133 feet (955 m).

McConville Peak was named in 1889 after one Arthur McConville.
